Sir Henry Cholmley of Roxby in Whitby Strand (1556–1616), was an English Member of Parliament.

He was the only son of Sir Richard Cholmley of Whitby, Yorkshire. He was educated at Hart Hall, Oxford (by 1568), Jesus College, Cambridge (1573) and Caius College, Cambridge, where he was a fellow commoner in 1573, after which he studied law at Lincoln's Inn in 1577. On the death of his half-brother in 1596 he inherited the family seat at Whitby.

He was elected a Member (MP) of the Parliament of England for Westmorland in 1597. He was knighted in 1603.

His wife, Margaret Babthorpe (daughter of Sir William Babthorpe, himself the son of Sir William Babthorpe, and Barbara, daughter of Sir Robert Constable), whom he married in about 1575. Their daughter Barbara Cholmley (c. 1575 – 28 February 1619) married Thomas Belasyse, 1st Viscount Fauconberg. Though his wife was a devout Roman Catholic, the couple converted to Protestantism in 1603.

Sir Henry and his wife had three sons and nine daughters. He was succeeded by his son Richard.

References

 

1556 births
1616 deaths
Alumni of Hart Hall, Oxford
Alumni of Jesus College, Cambridge
English MPs 1597–1598